Ju Yingzhi (born  in Dalian) is a Chinese-born Hong Kong professional footballer who currently plays as an attacking midfielder for Hong Kong Premier League club Southern. He represents Hong Kong on the international level.

He was a member of the Hong Kong Asian Games football team in 2010.

Club career

Citizen
Ju Yingzhi scored the winning goal to help Citizen beat Sun Hei 5–4 in a league game.

Pegasus
Ju Yingzhi signed to join Pegasus for the 2011–12 Hong Kong First Division League season. He is reported to have earned a huge pay rise for the move. But it was revealed that he has to go through surgery to cure a problem with his knee. He will therefore miss the first two to three months of the 2011–12 season.

Kitchee
On 15 June 2018, it was confirmed that Ju had signed with fellow Hong Kong Premier League club Kitchee.

Southern
On 10 August 2021, it was announced that Ju had signed for Southern.

International career
Ju Yingzhi scored one of the goals in the 4–0 win over Bangladesh in the group stage of the 2010 Asian Games in Guangzhou.

Career statistics

International

Hong Kong
As of 5 March 2014

Hong Kong U-23

Honours

Club
Dalian Shide
Chinese Super League: 2005
China U19 Champions Cup: 2006

Citizen
Hong Kong FA Cup: 2007–08
Hong Kong Senior Challenge Shield: 2010–11

Pegasus
Hong Kong League Cup: 2011–12

Eastern
Hong Kong Premier League: 2015–16
Hong Kong Senior Shield: 2015–16

Kitchee
 Hong Kong Premier League: 2019–20, 2020–21
 Hong Kong Senior Shield: 2018–19
 Hong Kong FA Cup: 2018–19
 Hong Kong Sapling Cup: 2019–20

International
Hong Kong U-23
Long Teng Cup: 2010

References

External links
 

1987 births
Living people
Hong Kong footballers
Chinese footballers
Footballers from Dalian
Dalian Shide F.C. players
Chinese Super League players
Citizen AA players
TSW Pegasus FC players
Eastern Sports Club footballers
Kitchee SC players
Southern District FC players
Hong Kong First Division League players
Hong Kong Premier League players
Chinese expatriate sportspeople in Hong Kong
Expatriate footballers in Hong Kong
Hong Kong international footballers
Footballers at the 2010 Asian Games
Footballers at the 2014 Asian Games
Association football midfielders
Asian Games competitors for China